2 Samuel 16 is the sixteenth chapter of the Second Book of Samuel in the Old Testament of the Christian Bible or the second part of Books of Samuel in the Hebrew Bible. According to Jewish tradition the book was attributed to the prophet Samuel, with additions by the prophets Gad and Nathan, but modern scholars view it as a composition of a number of independent texts of various ages from c. 630–540 BCE. This chapter contains the account of David's reign in Jerusalem. This is within a section comprising 2 Samuel 9–20 and continued to 1 Kings 1–2 which deal with the power struggles among David's sons to succeed David's throne until 'the kingdom was established in the hand of Solomon' (1 Kings 2:46).

Text
This chapter was originally written in the Hebrew language. It is divided into 23 verses.

Textual witnesses
Some early manuscripts containing the text of this chapter in Hebrew are of the Masoretic Text tradition, which includes the Codex Cairensis (895), Aleppo Codex (10th century), and Codex Leningradensis (1008). Fragments containing parts of this chapter in Hebrew were found among the Dead Sea Scrolls including 4Q51 (4QSam; 100–50 BCE) with extant verses 1–2, 6–8, 10–13, 17–18, 20–22.

Extant ancient manuscripts of a translation into Koine Greek known as the Septuagint (originally was made in the last few centuries BCE) include Codex Vaticanus (B; B; 4th century) and Codex Alexandrinus (A; A; 5th century).

Analysis
The story of Absalom's rebellion can be observed as five consecutive episodes:
A. David's flight from Jerusalem (15:13–16:14)
B. The victorious Absalom and his counselors (16:15–17:14)
C. David reaches Mahanaim (17:15–29)
B'. The rebellion is crushed and Absalom is executed (18:1–19:8abc)
A'. David's reentry into Jerusalem (19:8d–20:3)

God's role seems to be understated in the whole events, but is disclosed by a seemingly insignificant detail: 'the crossing of the Jordan river'. The Hebrew root word' 'br, "to cross" (in various nominal and verbal forms) is used more than 30 times in these chapters (compared to 20 times in the rest of 2 Samuel) to report David's flight from Jerusalem, his crossing of the Jordan river, and his reentry into Jerusalem. In 2 Samuel 17:16, stating that David should cross the Jordan (17:16), the verb 'br is even reinforced by a 'Hebrew infinitive absolute' to mark this critical moment: "king David is about to cross out of the land of Israel." David's future was in doubt until it was stated that God had rendered foolish Ahithophel's good counsel to Absalom (2 Samuel 17:14), thus granting David's prayer (15:31), and saving David from Absalom's further actions. Once Absalom was defeated, David's crossing back over the Jordan echoes the Israelites' first crossing over the Jordan under Joshua's leadership (Joshua 1–4):
Both David and Joshua crossed the Jordan and came to Gilgal (Joshua 4:19; 2 Samuel 19:40). 
Both were assisted by women who hid the good spies to save the mission: Rahab in Joshua 2:1–21 and the woman of Bahurim in 2 Samuel 17:20. 
Both episodes include the Ark of the Covenant, although David prevented the ark from crossing out of the land of Israel (15:25; referring to areas west of Jordan river).

Here God's role is not as explicit as during Joshua's crossing, but the signs are clear that God was with David, just as with Joshua.

David fled from Jerusalem (16:1–14)

This section continues the last one (2 Samuel 15:13–37), where David had the first three of five meetings on his way out of Jerusalem, with two other meetings —this time with two persons connected with the house of Saul.  

The first meeting was with Ziba, the servant of Mephibosheth (verses 1–4), who brought provisions for David and reported that Mephibosheth had decided to stay in Jerusalem, thinking that Saul's kingdom was to be returned to him. Later, Mephibosheth's words in 19:27–29 disputed this. However, at this time without a chance to investigate and against his better judgement, David accepted Ziba's report and granted him all of Saul's estates. 

The second meeting took place at Bahurim on the edge of the wilderness, where another Saulide called Shimei came out (verses 5–14) cursing David and calling him 'Murderer', while interpreting Absalom's take-over of the kingdom as God's revenge for 'the blood of the house of Saul' on David
(verse 8).
There are some possibilities of David's alleged crime:
 the execution of seven members of Saul's family at Gibeon (2 Samuel 21:1–14),
 the death of Abner (2 Samuel 3) and Ishbosheth (=Ishbaal; 2 Samuel 4),  for which David could have been held responsible, or 
 the deaths of Saul and Jonathan at Mount Gilboa (1 Samuel 31; 2 Samuel 1), for which David was implicated because at that time he had gone over to the Philistines.

David was unwilling to take action against Shimei, accepting the possibility that Shimei was cursing on YHWH's order (verse 10), so David resigned to God's will without protest (cf. 1 Samuel 26:9–11).
The conversation with Abishai about killing Shimei mirrors the one about killing Saul in 1 Samuel 26 as follows:

Absalom entered Jerusalem (16:15–23)
Absalom entered Jerusalem as a victor, and greeted by Hushai, called as "David's friend", with the standard acclamation, 'Long live the
king' to declare his allegiance to the new king (verse 16). Absalom instinctively suspected Hushai's signs of disloyalty to David, but was persuaded that Hushai considered Absalom to be God's elect and king by public acclamation and promised him the same loyalty as he had shown his father (verse 18).

As soon as he set himself in Jerusalem, Absalom unwisely accepted Ahitophel's advice (which was "esteemed and regarded as divine guidance" in verse 23) to go to his father's harem (cf. 2 Samuel 12:8; 1 Kings 2:22–23), thereby publicly declaring his claim to the throne, which in fact he had already taken. Ahitophel reasoned that such action was a decisive break of relations between son and father which would consolidate support from the anti-Davidic camp.

By having two wisest counsellors of that age (Ahitophel and Hushai), Absalom might be assured himself of success, without any thought of consulting YHWH (through the priests and the Ark of the Covenant), but this would be Absalom undoing, because Hushai would never counsel him to do wisely, whereas Ahitophel counselled him to do wickedly, basically to sin against YHWH.

Verse 18
And Hushai said to Absalom, "No, but whom the LORD and this people and all the men of Israel choose, his I will be, and with him I will remain."
Hushai's reply to Absalom's suspicion of his loyalty contains ambiguities, because, without mentioning any name, this circumlocution or descriptive character of the king of Israel would better fit David, whom the Lord had demonstratively chosen and the people of Israel had publicly anointed, instead of Absalom, who at this time had neither.
"This people": which refers to 'the citizens of Jerusalem' who had given general lamentation at David's departure (2 Samuel 15:23) and had not embraced Absalom as their new king.

See also

Related Bible parts: 2 Samuel 12, 2 Samuel 13, 2 Samuel 14, 2 Samuel 15

Notes

References

Sources

Commentaries on Samuel

General

External links
 Jewish translations:
 Samuel II - II Samuel - Chapter 16 (Judaica Press). Hebrew text and English translation [with Rashi's commentary] at Chabad.org
 Christian translations:
 Online Bible at GospelHall.org (ESV, KJV, Darby, American Standard Version, Bible in Basic English)
 2 Samuel chapter 16 Bible Gateway

16